The 2002 British Grand Prix (formally the LV Foster's British Grand Prix) was a Formula One motor race held at the Silverstone Circuit in Northamptonshire, England on 7 July 2002. The 60-lap race was the tenth race of the 2002 Formula One season and was won by Michael Schumacher, driving a Ferrari, with team-mate Rubens Barrichello second and Juan Pablo Montoya third in a Williams-BMW.

Qualifying
Qualifying saw Williams driver Juan Pablo Montoya edge out the two Ferraris to take his fourth consecutive pole position, beating Rubens Barrichello by 0.034 seconds and Michael Schumacher by 0.044. Ralf Schumacher was fourth in the other Williams, three-tenths of a second behind his brother but eight-tenths ahead of Kimi Räikkönen's McLaren in fifth. The top ten was completed by David Coulthard in the other McLaren, Jarno Trulli in the Renault, Mika Salo in the Toyota, Jacques Villeneuve in the BAR and Nick Heidfeld in the Sauber. Alex Yoong failed to set a lap within the 107% time in his Minardi and thus did not qualify.

Qualifying classification

Race
There were dark clouds overhead at the beginning of the race. On the formation lap, Barrichello stalled and was put to the back of the grid. Then, when the starting lights went out, Allan McNish in the second Toyota retired immediately with a clutch failure. In the early laps, Montoya led from Michael Schumacher, with Räikkönen overtaking Ralf for third and Barrichello charging through the field, reaching eighth by lap 6.

As the rain started to fall, the drivers made their first pit stops. Bridgestone teams changed from slick tyres to intermediates, but Michelin teams did not have that option as they had spent no time developing their own Intermediate solution throughout the season, thus forcing the affected teams to change from slicks straight to full wets, neither of which were ideal for the conditions.

Michael Schumacher and the Williams drivers all pitted on lap 13, but Ralf's stop went wrong as the Williams crew did not have his tyres ready. Coulthard briefly inherited the lead, but the McLaren team had gambled by leaving him out longer than the other leaders, bringing him in on lap 15. On lap 16, Michael Schumacher passed Montoya for the lead, and on lap 19 Barrichello completed his charge by passing the Colombian for second.

With the Bridgestone tyres better suited to the conditions than the Michelins, the Ferraris began to pull away. Meanwhile, Coulthard was struggling in ninth, McLaren's gamble having backfired. As the weather appeared to improve, the team brought him and fourth-placed Räikkönen in to change back to slicks. This too did not pay off, as the rain in fact got heavier, and after changing back to wets again, the McLarens toiled at the back of the field, leading Coulthard to experiment with Michelin's underdeveloped Intermediates for a small stint, but confirming they were not any more competitive than the wets. Coulthard eventually finished two laps behind Schumacher while Räikkönen retired on lap 45 with an engine failure.

The tyre issue also affected the Renaults, Trulli and Jenson Button running in the points before making three stops apiece. Trulli dropped out on lap 30 with an electrical problem, before Button suffered a suspension failure on lap 55.

Up at the front, Schumacher led Barrichello by 13 seconds at half-distance. By this point, the Ferraris were so far ahead that Barrichello retained an advantage of over half a minute over third-placed Montoya following a spin on lap 33. By making one fewer stop, Montoya managed to catch up with the Brazilian and overtake him on lap 41, but Barrichello repassed him five laps later and pulled away again. Ralf Schumacher benefitted from the misfortunes of the McLarens and the Renaults to regain fourth, only to have another pit stop go wrong when his fuel rig failed. This left four more Bridgestone drivers – Villeneuve, Heidfeld, Olivier Panis in the second BAR and Giancarlo Fisichella in the Jordan – occupying fourth to seventh.

Michael Schumacher eventually took the chequered flag 14.5 seconds ahead of Barrichello, with Montoya a further 17 seconds back and the last man on the lead lap. Villeneuve and Panis took fourth and fifth, securing BAR's first points of the season, while Heidfeld held off Fisichella for the final point.

This was Schumacher's seventh victory of the season and his 60th in all, and it extended his lead in the Drivers' Championship to 54 points – meaning that he could secure his fifth title at the next race, in France, with six races still to run. Schumacher set the record for most podium finishes with his 107th. Barrichello moved into second in the standings, one point ahead of Montoya and two ahead of Ralf Schumacher.

Race classification

Championship standings after the race 

Drivers' Championship standings

Constructors' Championship standings

Note: Only the top five positions are included for both sets of standings.

References

British Grand Prix
British Grand Prix
Grand Prix
British Grand Prix